The Australian threepence (pron. "thruppence"), commonly referred to as the "threepenny bit", is a small silver coin used in the Commonwealth of Australia prior to decimalisation. It was minted from 1910 until 1964, excluding 1913, 1929–1933 inclusive, 1937, 1945 and 1946. After decimalisation on 14 February 1966, the coin was equivalent to c, but was rapidly withdrawn from circulation.

During World War II, threepence production was supplemented by coinage produced by the United States Mint at the San Francisco and Denver mints. Coins minted at the San Francisco mint from 1942–1944 contain a small capital S on the reverse, while coins produced at the Denver mint from 1942–1943 have a small capital D on the reverse.

Types

Mintmarks
 D : Denver
 M : Melbourne
 PL : London
 S : San Francisco

See also

 Halfpenny (Australian)
 Penny (Australian)
 Sixpence (Australian)
 Shilling (Australian)
 Florin (Australian coin)

References
 
 Cruzis Coins : Australian silver threepence

External links
 Coins from Australia / Coin Type: Threepence - Online Coin Club
 The Commonwealth threepences
 Threepence | Blue Sheet

Coins of Australia
1910 establishments in Australia
1964 disestablishments in Australia